A stanza is a unit of poetry within a larger poem.

Stanza may also refer to:

 Lexcycle Stanza, a program for reading eBooks, digital newspapers, and other digital publications
 Nissan Stanza, an automobile manufactured by Nissan
 Stanza Poetry Festival, a poetry festival in St. Andrews, Scotland
 Stanza (computing)